Pudukkottai District is one of the 38 districts of Tamil Nadu state in southern India. The city of Pudukkottai is the district headquarters. It is also known colloquially as Pudhugai.

Pudukkottai district is bounded on the northeast and east by Thanjavur District, on the southeast by the Palk Strait, on the southwest by Ramanathapuram and Sivaganga districts, and on the west and northwest by Tiruchirapalli District. As of 2011, the district had a population of 1,618,345 with a sex-ratio of 1,015 females for every 1,000 males.

The district has an area of 4,663 km² with a coastline of 42 km. The district lies between 78° 25' and 79° 15' east longitude and between 9° 50' and 10° 40' of the north latitude.

Organisation
On 14 January 1975, Pudukkottai was organised as a separate district comprising the former Pudukkottai Division of Tiruchirappalli district with some additions from Thanjavur district. At present, this district is composed of three revenue divisions, namely, Pudukkottai, Aranthangi and Illupur and eleven taluks, namely, Kulathur, Illuppur, Alangudi, Pudukkottai, Gandarvakottai, Thirumayam, Aranthangi, Ponnamaravathi, Karambakudi, Avudaiyarkoil and Manamelkudi.  There are 762 revenue villages.

Demographics

According to 2011 census, Pudukkottai district had a population of 1,618,345 with a sex-ratio of 1,015 females for every 1,000 males, much above the national average of 929. 19.55% of the population lived in urban areas. A total of 179,688 were under the age of six, constituting 91,696 males and 87,992 females. Scheduled Castes and Scheduled Tribes accounted for 17.60% and 0.08% of the population, respectively. The average literacy of the district was 68.62%, compared to the national average of 72.99%. The district had a total of 387,679 households. There were a total of 761,693 workers, comprising 192,462 cultivators, 234,344 main agricultural labourers, 10,170 in house hold industries, 203,272 other workers, 121,445 marginal workers, 16,808 marginal cultivators, 70,805 marginal agricultural labourers, 3,771 marginal workers in household industries and 30,061 other marginal workers. Tamil is the predominant language, spoken by 99.23% of the population.

Politics 

|}

See also
List of districts of Tamil Nadu

References

External links

Pudukkottai District
 Tourism

 
Districts of Tamil Nadu
1974 establishments in Tamil Nadu